Craigmyle is a surname. The surname is also sometimes spelt Craigmile, and is thought to come from the nameplace in Kincardine O'Neil parish, Aberdeenshire. 

It may be a variation of Craigmillar, a family who acquired lands south of Edinburgh from the monks of Dunfermline Abbey, who had received a land grant by King David I in the 12th century. 

Baron Craigmyle is a title in the Peerage of the United Kingdom. 

It may refer to:

 Bessie Craigmyle, Scottish poet (1863–1933)
 Peter Craigmyle, soccer referee (1894-1979)
 Beach Craigmyle, Kentucky attorney

See also
Craigmyle, Alberta, a hamlet in Canada

Notes

Surnames of Scottish origin